Germany competed at the 2016 Summer Olympics in Rio de Janeiro, from 3 to 21 August 2016. This was the nation's seventh consecutive appearance at the Summer Olympics after its reunification in 1990.

Medalists

The following German competitors won medals at the Games.

| width="78%" align="left" valign="top" |

| width=22% align=left valign=top |

| width=22% align=left valign=top |

Competitors

| width=78% align=left valign=top |
The following is the list of number of competitors participating in the Games. Note that reserves in fencing, field hockey, football, and handball are not counted as athletes:

Archery

Two German archers qualified for both the men's and women's individual recurve by obtaining one of the eight Olympic places available from the 2015 World Archery Championships in Copenhagen, Denmark. Following the completion of internal selections, Florian Floto and Lisa Unruh were named to the German archery team on 23 June 2016.

Athletics

German athletes have so far achieved qualifying standards in the following athletics events (up to a maximum of 3 athletes in each event):
The team will select its athletes with a specific qualifying standard based on the results at the 2015 IAAF World Championships, the 2016 European Championships, Olympic trials, and other events approved by the German Athletics Association.

On 31 May 2016, six marathon runners (three per gender), highlighted by London 2012 Olympian Arne Gabius, were the first batch of German track and field athletes to be selected to the Olympic roster. On 28 July 2016, Arne Gabius declared his withdrawal from the Games due to a hip injury.

Following the end of the qualifying period, a total of 86 athletes (38 men and 48 women) were named to the track and field team for the Games; 28 of them managed to achieve their results at the German Championships (19 to 26 June), while the remainder were added through a discretionary selection criteria by the German Athletics Association. Notable German athletes featured reigning Olympic discus throw champion Robert Harting and his younger brother Christoph, shot put runner-up David Storl, hammer thrower Betty Heidler, pole vaulter Raphael Holzdeppe, Worlds medalists Rico Freimuth, Gesa Felicitas Krause and Christina Schwanitz, and javelin thrower and current world leader Thomas Röhler.

Men
Track & road events

Women

Field events
Men

Women

Combined events – Men's decathlon

Combined events – Women's heptathlon

Badminton

Germany has qualified a total of seven badminton players for each of the following events into the Olympic tournament based on the BWF World Rankings as of 5 May 2016: one entry each in the men's and women's singles, and a pair in the men's, women's, and mixed doubles. The badminton team was officially named as part of the first batch of nominated athletes to the Olympic roster on 31 May 2016.

Men

Women

Mixed

Boxing

Germany has entered six boxers to compete in the following weight classes into the Olympic boxing tournament. Artem Harutyunyan and Erik Pfeifer were the only Germans finishing among the top two of their respective division in the AIBA Pro Boxing series, whereas David Graf did so in the World Series of Boxing. Light heavyweight boxer Serge Michel had claimed an Olympic spot with his quarterfinal triumph at the 2016 AIBA World Qualifying Tournament in Baku, Azerbaijan.

Hamza Touba and Arajik Marutjan rounded out the German roster by virtue of their top two finish at the 2016 APB and WSB Olympic Qualifier in Vargas, Venezuela.

Canoeing

Slalom
German canoeists have qualified a maximum of one boat in each of the following classes through the 2015 ICF Canoe Slalom World Championships. The roster of German slalom canoeists, led by London 2012 medalists Hannes Aigner and Sideris Tasiadis, was announced on 17 April 2016 as a result of their top performances at two selection meets of the Olympic Trials, both held in Augsberg (8 to 10 April) and Markkleeberg (15 to 17 April).

Sprint
German canoeists have qualified a total of six boats in each of the following distances for the Games through the 2015 ICF Canoe Sprint World Championships. Meanwhile, two additional boats (women's K-1 200 m and women's K-1 500 m) were awarded to the German squad by virtue of a top two national finish at the 2016 European Qualification Regatta in Duisburg, Germany.

A total of 11 sprint canoeists (six men and five women), highlighted by London 2012 champions Sebastian Brendel (men's C-1 1000 m) and women's kayak duo Tina Dietze and Franziska Weber, were named as part of the second batch of nominated athletes to the German roster for the Games on 28 June 2016.

Men

Women

Qualification Legend: FA = Qualify to final (medal); FB = Qualify to final B (non-medal)

Cycling

Road
German riders qualified for the following quota places in the men's and women's Olympic road race by virtue of their top 15 final national ranking in the 2015 UCI World Tour (for men) and top 22 in the UCI World Ranking (for women). The road cycling team, highlighted by London 2012 time trial runner-up Tony Martin, was named to the Olympic roster on 25 June 2016.

Men

Women

Track
Following the completion of the 2016 UCI Track Cycling World Championships, German riders have accumulated spots in both men's and women's team pursuit, and men's and women's team sprint, as well as both the men's and women's omnium. As a result of their place in the men's and women's team sprint, Germany has won the right to enter two riders in both men's and women's sprint and men's and women's keirin.

Deutscher Olympischer Sportbund (DOSB) announced the full track cycling squad, as part of the first batch of nominated German athletes, on 31 May 2016. Among these cyclists featured defending Olympic champions Kristina Vogel and Miriam Welte in women's team sprint. Henning Bommel (men's team pursuit) and Anna Knauer (women's Omnium) rounded out the lineup on 28 June 2016.

Sprint

Team sprint

Pursuit

Keirin

Omnium

Mountain biking
German mountain bikers qualified for two men's and two women's quota places into the Olympic cross-country race, as a result of the nation's sixth-place finish for men and second for women in the UCI Olympic Ranking List of 25 May 2016. The mountain biking team was named to the Olympic roster on 13 June 2016, with three-time medalist Sabine Spitz riding in the cross-country race at her fifth straight Games.

BMX
German riders qualified for one men's and one women's quota place in BMX at the Olympics, as a result of the nation's top three finish for men in the UCI BMX Individual Ranking List of 31 May 2016 and top two for women, not yet qualified, at the 2016 UCI BMX World Championships. London 2012 Olympian Luis Brethauer and BMX rookie Nadja Pries were named to the German cycling team.

Diving

German divers qualified for five individual spots and three synchronized teams at the Olympics through the 2015 FINA World Championships and the 2016 FINA World Cup series. A total of eight divers (four per gender), highlighted by Beijing 2008 silver medalists Patrick Hausding and Sascha Klein in men's synchronized platform, were named as part of the second batch of nominated German athletes to the Olympic roster on 28 June 2016.

Men

Women

Equestrian

Germany became one of the first three nations to earn places at the Games, qualifying a complete team in dressage by winning the team event at the 2014 FEI World Equestrian Games. The German eventing team also qualified for Rio by winning the gold medal at the same World Games.

Dressage

Eventing

"#" indicates that the score of this rider does not count in the team competition, since only the best three results of a team are counted.

Jumping

"#" indicates that the score of this rider does not count in the team competition, since only the best three results of a team are counted.

Fencing

Germany has entered four fencers into the Olympic competition. Max Hartung and Matyas Szabo (both in men's sabre), along with Carolin Golubytskyi in the women's foil, had claimed their Olympic spots on the German team by finishing among the top 14 individuals in the FIE Adjusted Official Rankings. They were joined by Peter Joppich, who has been set to compete at his fourth Olympics as one of the two highest-ranked fencers coming from the Europe zone in the men's foil.

Field hockey

Summary

Men's tournament

Germany's men's field hockey team qualified for the Olympics by having achieved a top three finish at the 2014–15 Men's FIH Hockey World League Semifinals.

Team roster

Group play

Quarterfinal

Semifinal

Bronze medal match

Women's tournament

The German women's field hockey team qualified for the Olympics by having achieved a top three finish at the 2014–15 Women's FIH Hockey World League Semifinals.

Team roster

Group play

Quarterfinal

Semifinal

Bronze medal match

Football

Summary

Men's tournament

Germany's men's football team qualified for the Olympics by reaching the semifinals at the 2015 UEFA European Under-21 Championship in the Czech Republic.

Team roster

Group play

Quarterfinal

Semifinal

Gold medal match

Women's tournament

The German women's football team qualified for the Olympics by reaching the top three for European teams at the 2015 FIFA Women's World Cup in Canada.

Team roster

Group play

Quarterfinal

Semifinal

Final

Golf 

Germany has entered four golfers (two per gender) into the Olympic tournament. Alex Čejka (world no. 143), Martin Kaymer (world no. 52), Sandra Gal (world no. 55), and Caroline Masson (world no. 77) qualified directly among the top 60 eligible players for their respective individual events based on the IGF World Rankings as of 11 July 2016.

Gymnastics

Artistic
Germany has fielded a full squad of ten gymnasts (five men and five women) into the Olympic competition. Both men's and women's squads had claimed one of the remaining four spots each in the team all-around at the Olympic Test Event in Rio de Janeiro. The men's and women's artistic gymnastics squads, highlighted by London 2012 silver medalists Marcel Nguyen and three-time Olympian Fabian Hambüchen, were named at the completion of two German Olympic selection trial meets on 10 July 2016.

Men
Team

Individual finals

Women
Team

Individual finals

Rhythmic 
Germany has qualified a squad of rhythmic gymnasts in both individual and group all-around for the Games by claiming one of eight available Olympic spots (for individual) and three (for group) at the Olympic Test Event in Rio de Janeiro. The rhythmic gymnastics squad was named to the Olympic roster on 7 July 2016.

Trampoline
Germany has qualified one gymnast in the women's trampoline by virtue of a top six finish at the 2016 Olympic Test Event in Rio de Janeiro.

Handball

Summary

Men's tournament

The German men's handball team qualified for the Olympics by attaining a top finish and securing a lone outright berth at the 2016 European Men's Handball Championship in Poland.

Team roster

Group play

Quarterfinal

Semifinal

Bronze medal match

Judo

Germany has qualified a full squad of 13 judokas for each of the following weight classes at the Games. Twelve of them (six per gender) were ranked among the top 22 eligible judokas for men and top 14 for women in the IJF World Ranking List of 30 May 2016, while Marc Odenthal earned a continental quota spot from the European region as the highest-ranked German judoka outside of direct qualifying position. The judo team, highlighted by London 2012 Olympians Tobias Englmaier and Miryam Roper, was announced on 6 June 2016.

Men

Women

Modern pentathlon

German athletes have qualified for the following spots to compete in modern pentathlon. 2008 Olympic champion Lena Schöneborn secured a selection in the women's event by gaining two of the eight Olympic slots available from the 2015 European Championships, while her teammate Annika Schleu finished among the top ten individuals in the UIPM World Rankings as of 1 June 2016. Patrick Dogue and Christian Zillekens granted their invitations from UIPM to compete in the men's event, as three of the next highest-ranked eligible modern pentathletes, not yet qualified, in the World Rankings.

Rowing

Germany has qualified ten out of fourteen boats for each of the following rowing classes into the Olympic regatta. Majority of rowing crews had confirmed Olympic places for their boats at the 2015 FISA World Championships in Lac d'Aiguebelette, France, while the rowers competing in men's lightweight four were further added to the German roster with their top two finish at the 2016 European & Final Qualification Regatta in Lucerne, Switzerland.

A total of 35 rowers (25 men and 10 women) were officially selected as part of the second batch of nominated German athletes to the Olympic roster on 28 June 2016, with Sydney 2000 bronze medalist Marcel Hacker racing with his partner Stephan Krüger in the men's double sculls at his fifth straight Games.

Men

Women

Qualification Legend: FA=Final A (medal); FB=Final B (non-medal); FC=Final C (non-medal); FD=Final D (non-medal); FE=Final E (non-medal); FF=Final F (non-medal); SA/B=Semifinals A/B; SC/D=Semifinals C/D; SE/F=Semifinals E/F; QF=Quarterfinals; R=Repechage

Sailing

German sailors have qualified one boat in each of the following classes through the 2014 ISAF Sailing World Championships, the individual fleet Worlds, and European qualifying regattas. Two skiff crews (Heil & Plößel and Jurczok & Lorenz), along with two-time Olympic windsurfer Toni Wilhelm, were among the first German sailors to be selected to the Olympic team, following the completion of Princess Sofia Trophy regatta. The 470 crews (Gerz & Szymanski and Bochmann & Steinherr) had claimed their Olympic spots at the European Championships, while Laser sailor Philipp Buhl rounded out the German selection at the ISAF World Cup meet in Hyères, France.

The sailing crew was officially named as part of the first batch of nominated athletes to the Olympic roster on 31 May 2016.

Men

Women

Mixed

M = Medal race; EL = Eliminated – did not advance into the medal race

Shooting

German shooters have achieved quota places for the following events by virtue of their best finishes at the 2014 and 2015 ISSF World Shooting Championships, the 2015 ISSF World Cup series, and European Championships or Games, as long as they obtained a minimum qualifying standard (MQS) by 31 March 2016.
The rifle and pistol shooting team was announced at the Munich leg of the ISSF World Cup series on 24 May 2016, featuring European Games champion Henri Junghänel, three-time Olympian Barbara Engleder, and Beijing 2008 Olympic bronze medalist Christian Reitz. Clay target shooters Andreas Löw and two-time Olympian Christine Wenzel were named to the German shooting roster on 30 May 2016, while London 2012 skeet shooter Ralf Buchheim and trap specialist Jana Beckmann completed the nation's shooting lineup at the Baku leg of the ISSF World Cup on 24 June 2016.

With a double starter (owned by Engleder) securing quota places in two women's rifle events, the German team decided to exchange one of them with the women's 25 m pistol instead based on performances throughout the qualifying period. The slot was awarded to European Games bronze medalist Monika Karsch.

Men

Women

Qualification Legend: Q = Qualify for the next round; q = Qualify for the bronze medal (shotgun)

Swimming

German swimmers have so far achieved qualifying standards in the following events (up to a maximum of 2 swimmers in each event at the Olympic Qualifying Time (OQT), and potentially 1 at the Olympic Selection Time (OST)): To assure their selection to the Olympic team, swimmers must finish first or second under the federation's standards in their respective events at the German Olympic Trials (5 to 8 May) in Berlin, and then confirm their places at another selection meet: any leg of the Mare Nostrum tour or the German Open (exactly two months after the trials).

The German Swimming Federation (DSV) selected the first batch of swimmers based on their intermediate results at the Olympic Trials and Mare Nostrum Tour, while the remaining batch rounded out the swimming roster for the Olympics through the German Open. All in all, a total of 27 swimmers (16 men and 11 women) were named to the German team for the Games on 12 July 2016, including two-time world record holder Paul Biedermann in middle-distance freestyle, 2015 Worlds champion Marco Koch (200 m breaststroke), and freestyle sprinter Dorothea Brandt, who returned from a 12-year comeback to her second Games.

Men

Women

Table tennis

Germany has fielded a team of six athletes into the table tennis competition at the Games. Europe's top table tennis player Dimitrij Ovtcharov secured the outright Olympic berth by winning the men's singles title at the 2015 European Games. Meanwhile, four-time Olympian Timo Boll, along with Han Ying and Petrissa Solja, took the remaining spots at the European Qualification Tournament in Halmstad, Sweden.

Bastian Steger and Chinese-born Shan Xiaona were each awarded the third spot to build the men's and women's teams for the Games as the top European nation in the ITTF Olympic Rankings.

Men

Women

Taekwondo

Germany entered three athletes into the taekwondo competition at the Olympics. 2008 Olympian Levent Tuncat and Tahir Güleç qualified automatically for their respective weight classes by finishing in the top 6 WTF Olympic rankings. Rabia Gülec secured a third spot on the German team by virtue of her finish in the women's welterweight category (67 kg) at the 2016 European Qualification Tournament in Istanbul, Turkey.

Tennis

Germany has entered eight tennis players (three men, five women) into the Olympic tournament. Alexander Zverev (world no. 38) and Philipp Kohlschreiber (world no. 26) qualified directly for the men's singles as two of the top 56 eligible players in the ATP World Rankings, while Angelique Kerber (world no. 4), Andrea Petkovic (world no. 33), Annika Beck (world no. 41), and Laura Siegemund (world no. 42) did so for the women's singles based on their WTA World Rankings as of 6 June 2016. Jamaican-born Dustin Brown and Jan-Lennard Struff had also claimed two of six ITF Olympic men's singles places to join Zverev and Kohlschreiber, as Germany's top-ranked tennis players outside of direct qualifying position.

Having been directly entered to the singles, Siegemund also opted to play with her partner Anna-Lena Grönefeld in the women's doubles.

On 30 July 2016, Zverev announced his withdrawal from the Games due to physical problems.

Men

Women

Triathlon

Germany has qualified two triathletes for the women's event at the Olympics. London 2012 Olympian Anne Haug and rookie Laura Lindemann were ranked among the top 40 eligible triathletes based on the ITU Olympic Qualification List as of 15 May 2016.

Volleyball

Beach
Three German beach volleyball teams (one men's pair and two women's pairs) qualified directly for the Olympics by virtue of their nation's top 15 placement in the FIVB Olympic Rankings as of 13 June 2016. Among the beach volleyball players featured two-time Olympian Laura Ludwig, along with her rookie partner Kira Walkenhorst.

Weightlifting

German weightlifters have qualified four men's quota places for the Rio Olympics based on their combined team standing by points at the 2014 and 2015 IWF World Championships. A single women's Olympic spot had been added to the German roster by virtue of a top six national finish at the 2016 European Championships. The team must allocate these places to individual athletes by 20 June 2016.

The weightlifting team was named to the Olympic roster on 2 July 2016, with Almir Velagic and Jürgen Spieß remarkably going to their second Olympics.

Wrestling

Germany has qualified a total of seven wrestlers for each of the following weight classes into the Olympic competition. Two of them finished among the top six to book Olympic spot each in the men's Greco-Roman 66 kg and women's freestyle 69 kg at the 2015 World Championships, while two more Olympix berths were awarded to German wrestlers, who progressed to the top two finals at the 2016 European Qualification Tournament.

Three further wrestlers had claimed the remaining Olympic slots to round out the German roster in separate World Qualification Tournaments; two of them at the initial meet in Ulaanbaatar and two more at the final meet in Istanbul.

Men's Greco-Roman

Women's freestyle

See also
Germany at the 2016 Summer Paralympics

References

External links 

 

Olympics
2016
Germany